Thermopsis lanceolata, the tapered false lupin (or lupine), is a species of flowering plant in the legume family Fabaceae, native to Russia (Siberia), Kazakhstan, Mongolia, Nepal and China (Hebei Sheng, Gansu Sheng, Shanxi Sheng, Shaanxi Sheng, Qinghai Sheng, Nei Mongol Zizhiqu (s.)). It is closely related to the familiar lupins of gardens, but with a more bushy appearance. 

The plant is tough and resilient, tolerating a wide range of growing conditions, but resents disturbance.

The Latin specific epithet lanceolata means 'spear-shaped', in reference to the leaves.

References 

Flora of Siberia
Flora of China
Flora of Nepal
Flora of Mongolia
Sophoreae